The 2002 Oman cyclone (JTWC designation: 01A, officially known as Cyclonic Storm ARB 01) was a  tropical cyclone that struck the Dhofar region of Oman in May 2002. The first storm of the 2002 North Indian Ocean cyclone season, it developed on May 6 in the Arabian Sea, and it maintained a general west-northwest track for much of its duration. The storm was rare, in the sense that it was one of only twelve tropical cyclones on record to approach the Arabian Peninsula in the month of May.

The storm brought the heaviest number of people to Dhofar in 30 years, causing flooding and creating rivers in wadis, or typically dry riverbeds. Several people drowned after their vehicles were swept away by the flooding. The storm caused locally heavy damage, totaling $25 million (2002 USD).

Meteorological history

An area of convection developed on May 2, 2002 near Sri Lanka, associated with a weak and broad circulation center. The system tracked west-northwestward through the Arabian Sea along a trough near the equator. Its thunderstorm activity was enhanced by a ridge to its north, though was also removed from the center. By May 5, the circulation had become better defined, and concurrently the convection increased over the center. After further organization, the India Meteorological Department (IMD) classified the system as Depression ARB01A on May 6.

After becoming a tropical cyclone, the depression turned to a northwest motion before resuming a track to the west-northwest. On May 7 it intensified into a deep depression, and though its winds had increased, the structure became disorganized as the center became exposed from the thunderstorm activity. The convection waned, due to the influence of dry air from the Arabian Peninsula, as well as from wind shear. As a result, the IMD downgraded it to depression status early on May 8.

The storm maintained poleward outflow as it continued west-northwestward. Around that time, the storm was estimated by the JTWC to have attained peak winds of 85 km/h (50 km/h), with an atmospheric pressure of 991 mbar. While located a short distance offshore, the storm turned to the northwest and weakened slightly. At about 0900 UTC on May 10, the storm made landfall near Salalah, Oman. Shortly thereafter, it began dissipation over Oman. Its landfall in the Dhofar region of Oman was uncommon; in the period from 1891 to 1990, only 17 tropical depressions or storms struck the region.

Impact

The storm dropped heavy rainfall in the vicinity of its landfall, which were the greatest totals in 30 years in the Dhofar region. The city of Salalah reported  in a 24‑hour period as the storm moved ashore, which was more than 300% of its average monthly for May. As a result, some flooding was reported in the city, and several wadis, or typically dry riverbeds, became sudden rivers in the area; one station recorded a discharge of 1146 m3/s (40,470 ft3/s).

Damage was severe and widespread, estimated at $25 million (2002 USD). Storm impact included property, crop, transportation, and agricultural damage, with hundreds of cattle drowning during the passage of the storm. Across the Dhofar region of Oman, the storm caused several injuries and a total of nine fatalities; most of the deaths were drownings, occurring when their vehicles were swept away by flooding in typically dry areas. Two army soldiers and one police officer drowned while saving other people in danger.

In the aftermath of the storm, the Omani government received 4,000 requests for assistance, and in turn provided financial aid to 500 families; additionally, the government supplied temporary housing for displaced people.

See also

List of Arabian Peninsula tropical cyclones
1996 Oman cyclone

References

External links
Cyclones and depressions over north Indian Ocean during 2002 – report by India Meteorological Department

Tropical cyclones in Oman
Oman
Cyclonic storms
Tropical cyclones in 2002